Peter Metcalfe (5 November 1931 – 13 February 2016) was an English professional rugby league footballer who played in the 1950s, and coached.

Background
Peter Metcalfe's birth was registered in Prescot district, Lancashire, England, he sustained a broken knee cap during St. Helens' 26-18 victory over York at Knowsley Road, St. Helens, on Saturday 3 September 1955, this injury ended his rugby league career, and he died aged 84 in Scarborough, North Yorkshire, England.

Playing career

International honours
Peter Metcalfe won a cap for England while at St. Helens in 1953 against France, and represented Rugby League XIII while at St. Helens in 1954 against Australasia.

County Cup Final appearances
Peter Metcalfe played , and scored 5-goals in St. Helens' 16-8 victory over Wigan in the 1953 Lancashire County Cup Final during the 1953–54 season at Station Road, Swinton on Saturday 24 October 1953.

References

External links
Profile at saints.org.uk
Search for "Peter Metcalfe" at britishnewspaperarchive.co.uk

1931 births
2016 deaths
England national rugby league team players
English rugby league coaches
English rugby league players
Pilkington Recs coaches
Pilkington Recs players
Rugby league centres
Rugby league five-eighths
Rugby league fullbacks
Rugby league players from Prescot
Rugby League XIII players
St Helens R.F.C. players